Something's Up is an album by guitarist Doug Raney recorded in 1988 and released on the Danish label, SteepleChase.

Track listing 
All compositions by Doug Raney except where noted.
 "Something's Up" – 6:26
 "Good Morning Heartache" (Ervin Drake, Dan Fisher, Irene Higginbotham) – 11:08
 "Speedy Recovery" – 6:07   
 "Upper Manhattan Medical Group" (Billy Strayhorn) – 6:42
 "Nobody Else But Me" (Bartley Costello, Andrew B. Sterling) – 6:44
 "Visceral Drives" – 6:52
 "Dolphin Dance" (Herbie Hancock) – 9:01 Bonus track on CD reissue
 "Mohawk" (Charlie Parker) – 6:59 Bonus track on CD reissue

Personnel 
Doug Raney – guitar
Ben Besiakov – piano
Jesper Lundgaard – bass
Billy Hart – drums

References 

Doug Raney albums
1988 albums
SteepleChase Records albums